Blood of the Nations is the twelfth studio album by German heavy metal band Accept. It is the band's first studio recording since 1996's Predator and the first album to feature vocalist Mark Tornillo and drummer Stefan Schwarzmann. It is the first Accept album without Udo Dirkschneider on vocals since Eat the Heat (1989), and the band's first album to feature guitarist Herman Frank since Balls to the Wall (1983).

Reception

Since its release, Blood of the Nations has been met with positive reviews. Reviewer Scott Alisoglu of Blabbermouth.net reviewed the album positively saying that Blood of the Nations "is the shot in the arm that fans of traditional heavy metal needed", and gave the album 8.5 out of 10. The album also received a positive review from musicreview.co.za, with reviewer Sergio Pereira saying that "This isn't about 3-minute radio-friendly singles, Blood of the Nations is about metal – cold hard metal", and noting that minute-long solos, such as the one in the album track "Pandemic", are rare in current music.

Blood of the Nations debuted at number four on the German albums chart, making it Accept's first highest chart position since Russian Roulette (1986), and their second highest chart position (their 2014 album Blind Rage would debut at number one). It was also Accept's first album to enter the Billboard 200 since Eat the Heat (1989), though it peaked at number 187, making it the band's lowest chart position to date.

Accolades
In 2010, The Dinosaur Rock Guitar forum honored Blood of the Nations with a Dino award for "Album of the Year". The album won two Metal Storm Awards that same year, when it was voted Best Heavy Metal Album and Biggest Surprise.

The album was voted the "#1 Comeback Album" in a 2013 VH1 poll. Also in 2013, Metal Shock Finland declared it "The Best Shocking Comeback Album".

At the German edition of the Metal Hammer Awards show in 2011, the song "Teutonic Terror" won the "Metal Anthem" award.

Track list

Personnel
 Mark Tornillo – lead vocals
 Wolf Hoffmann – lead and rhythm guitars
 Herman Frank – rhythm guitar, lead guitar on "Rolling Thunder"
 Peter Baltes – bass guitar
 Stefan Schwarzmann – drums

Charts

References

Accept (band) albums
2010 albums
Albums produced by Andy Sneap
Nuclear Blast albums